Godsway Donyoh (born 14 October 1994) is a Ghanaian professional footballer who plays as a striker for Apollon Limassol in the Cypriot First Division.

Career

Manchester City 
Born in Accra, Donyoh progressed through the Right to Dream academy and moved to English club Manchester City as a 17-year-old. He progressed through the youth system, before it was decided that he was to be loaned out.

Loans to Sweden
From there, he was loaned out to Swedish club Djurgårdens IF in 2013 through a cooperation agreement between the clubs, in order to receive more playing time. This was agreed upon after impressing in a trial over three games. In the 2012–13 Svenska Cupen, Donyoh reached the final with the club where they eventually lost to IF Elfsborg. In the league, he made 20 appearances in which made two goals and contributed with two assists. He also made thirteen appearances for the Djurgården U21 in which he scored 10 goals and made one assist. After the season, Manchester City informed Djurgården that his loan could be extended, but that Donyoh would have to be utilised as a forward instead of as a winger; the position where Djurgården had mostly played him. The Swedish club could not guarantee playing time as a forward, and it was therefore decided that Donyoh would return to Manchester City.

After his return to England, Donyoh took part in team training before being loaned out to another Swedish Allsvenskan club, this time to Falkenbergs FF. He scored his first goal for Falkenbergs FF on 12 May 2014 against his former club Djurgården – a 90th-minute goal securing a 1–0 win. In 35 competitive games for the first team and the U21, he scored seven goals and made four assists. At the end of 2015 season, Falkenbergs FF won out in a relegation battle with IK Sirius, and thus ensured a place in the top division for the following season.

Nordsjælland
Having made no appearances for Manchester City since his arrival in 2011, Donyoh was signed on a permanent deal by Danish Superliga club FC Nordsjælland ahead of the 2015–16 season; a club also involved in the Right to Dream academy. Donyoh's most successful season for the club was during the 2018–19 season, where he managed to score ten goals and make two assists in 28 league appearances. As Nordsjælland had finished third in the previous year's Superliga, he took part in the Europa League qualifying rounds with the team, who were eventually knocked out in the third round against Serbian club Partizan.

Loan to Dynamo Dresden
After making only nine appearances during the 2018–19 season, three of them for the Nordsjælland reserves, Donyoh was loaned with an option to buy to German 2. Bundesliga club Dynamo Dresden in January 2020.

Maccabi Haifa
On 26 September 2020, Donyoh signed a two-year contract with Maccabi Haifa in the Israeli Premier League, in a deal estimated at around €100,000. He made his debut for the club on 1 October 2020 in the UEFA Europa League qualifiers in a 7–2 loss to Tottenham Hotspur. He made his league debut on 7 October in his team's 1–2 home win over Ashdod.

Career statistics

Honours
Maccabi Haifa
 Israeli Premier League: 2020–21, 2021–22
 Toto Cup: 2021–22
 Israel Super Cup: 2021

References

External links
 
 

1994 births
Living people
Ghanaian footballers
Footballers from Accra
Right to Dream Academy players
Manchester City F.C. players
Djurgårdens IF Fotboll players
Falkenbergs FF players
FC Nordsjælland players
Dynamo Dresden players
Maccabi Haifa F.C. players
Neftçi PFK players
Apollon Limassol FC players
Allsvenskan players
Danish Superliga players
2. Bundesliga players
Israeli Premier League players
Azerbaijan Premier League players
Cypriot First Division players
Ghanaian expatriate footballers
Expatriate footballers in England
Expatriate men's footballers in Denmark
Expatriate footballers in Germany
Expatriate footballers in Sweden
Expatriate footballers in Israel
Expatriate footballers in Azerbaijan
Expatriate footballers in Cyprus
Ghanaian expatriate sportspeople in England
Ghanaian expatriate sportspeople in Denmark
Ghanaian expatriate sportspeople in Germany
Ghanaian expatriate sportspeople in Sweden
Ghanaian expatriate sportspeople in Israel
Ghanaian expatriate sportspeople in Azerbaijan
Ghanaian expatriate sportspeople in Cyprus
Association football midfielders